A pew is a long bench seat used for seating members of a congregation or choir in a church.

Pew may also refer to:

Organizations
 Pew Research Center, an American think tank based in Washington, D.C.
 The Pew Charitable Trusts, an American non-profit organization based in Philadelphia, Pennsylvania
 Pew Center for Arts & Heritage
 Pew Fellowships in the Arts, program of The Pew Center for Arts & Heritage
 Pew Center on Global Climate Change

People
J. Howard Pew (1882–1971), American philanthropist and president of Sunoco
John Pew (born 1956), American racing driver
Joseph Newton Pew (1848–1912), founder of Sun Oil Company and philanthropist
Joseph N. Pew Jr. (1886–1963), American industrialist and influential member of the Republican Party
Richard Pew (born 1933), American research psychologist and Olympic fencer
PewDiePie, a Swedish YouTuber
Tracy Pew (1957–1986), Australian musician

Other uses
 PEW, percussion welding
 Pew (Treasure Island), a character in the novel
 Pew, a 2020 novel by Catherine Lacey
 Peshawar International Airport (IATA code PEW), in Peshawar, North West Frontier Province, Pakistan
 PEWS, or Pediatric Early Warning Signs
 Something said when something has an unpleasant odor
 The sound a laser gun makes, as in the name PewDiePie

See also
 PU (disambiguation)